The Gaming Control Commission was an agency responsible for regulating gambling and other financial games of chance in Ontario.  In 1996, it was replaced by the Alcohol and Gaming Commission of Ontario with the passage of the Alcohol and Gaming Regulation and Public Protection Act (Ontario).

Overview 

The Alcohol and Gaming Commission of Ontario (AGCO) regulates the operation of  casinos, slot machine facilities  and internet gaming operated by the Ontario Lottery and Gaming Corporation (OLG). Key activities include:
 Approving and monitoring internal control systems, surveillance and security systems, and other operational systems for casinos, slot machine facilities  and internet gaming for compliance with all regulatory requirements.
 Testing, approving and monitoring slot machines and gaming and lottery management systems.
 Inspecting and monitoring  casinos, slot machine facilities and internet gaming for compliance with the Gaming Control Act, 1992, its regulations, licence requirements and other standards and requirements established by the Registrar of  Alcohol and Gaming.
 Approving rules of play or changes to rules of play for games of chance conducted and managed by the OLG.
 Through its Investigations and Enforcement Bureau which is under the direction of the Ontario Provincial Police, maintaining OPP Casino Enforcement operations at all times while the casinos are open to the public.
 Registering  suppliers and gaming assistants.

References 

Defunct Ontario government departments and agencies
1996 disestablishments in Ontario